Ron Barry was a professional, Irish, jump jockey with a career spanning 1960 to 1980s, mainly riding in Great Britain.

He won the Whitbread Gold Cup three times in 1971, 1973, and 1974. In 1969, he won the Scottish Grand National, the Massey Ferguson Gold Cup, and the Mackeson Gold Cup. He set a record of 125 race wins, was British jump racing Champion Jockey in the 1973 and 1974 seasons, and was stable jockey to Gordon W. Richards.

References
Owen, Garry (2003) Where are they now?; Ron Barry. Scottish Daily Record. Retrieved 2011-03-02.

Living people
Irish jockeys
British Champion jumps jockeys
Year of birth missing (living people)